Naples yellow, also called antimony yellow, is an inorganic pigment used in paintings during the period 1700–1850. Colors range from a muted, or earthy, reddish yellow pigment to a bright light yellow.  It is the chemical compound lead antimonate (Pb2Sb2O7). Also known as jaune d'antimoine, it is one of the oldest synthetic pigments. The Ancient Egyptians were known to create it.

The related mineral is bindheimite. However, this natural version was rarely, if ever, used as a pigment.

The mineral orpiment is the oldest yellow pigment, but Naples yellow, is the oldest clear yellow pigment of synthetic origin.
  It largely replaced lead-tin-yellow during the eighteenth century.

The first recorded use of Naples yellow as a color name in English was in 1738.

After 1800, Naples Yellow was superseded by chrome yellow (lead chromate), cadmium sulfide, and cobalt yellow.

See also
 List of inorganic pigments

References

Literature

 Wainwright, I.N.M., Taylor, J.M. and Harley, R.D. Lead Antimonate yellow, in Artists’ Pigments. A Handbook of Their History and Characteristics, Vol. 1: Feller, R.L. (Ed.) Oxford University Press 1986, p. 219 – 254

External links
 Naples yellow, ColourLex
 List of colors

Inorganic pigments
Shades of yellow